Chester Chet Mason (born April 25, 1981) is an American professional basketball player. He is a 1,93 (6 ft 4in) tall guard who last played for BC Novosibirsk of the Russian Basketball Super League.

Mason was named the Adriatic League MVP in the 2009–10 season, while he was playing for Široki averaging 19.96 index points per game.

Mason made 117 career starts for the RedHawks under Coach Charlie Coles, the program’s second-most all-time. He and Ron Harper are the program’s only players to compile over 1,200 points, 800 rebounds, 300 assists and 150 steals in a career. Mason’s 806 career rebounds rank first among Miami’s guards.

Mason was named the MAC Defensive Player of the Year and the RedHawks’ Male Co-Athlete of the Year in 2005. He was a first-team All-MAC selection that season when he led Miami to a regular-season league title and NIT berth.

External links
 Chester Mason at abaliga.com
 Eurobasket.com Profile 

1981 births
Living people
ABA League players
Albany Patroons players
American expatriate basketball people in Bosnia and Herzegovina
American expatriate basketball people in Croatia
American expatriate basketball people in France
American expatriate basketball people in Israel
American expatriate basketball people in Latvia
American expatriate basketball people in Russia
American expatriate basketball people in Slovenia
American men's basketball players
Anaheim Arsenal players
Basketball players from Cleveland
BK Ventspils players
Bnei HaSharon players
Fenerbahçe men's basketball players
Guards (basketball)
HKK Široki players
KK Zlatorog Laško players
KK Zadar players
Los Angeles D-Fenders players
Miami RedHawks men's basketball players
STB Le Havre players